Là-bas may refer to:

Là-bas (novel), 1891 novel by French writer Joris-Karl Huysmans
"Là-bas" (song), 1987 song by Jean-Jacques Goldman
Là-bas (film), 2006 documentary film by director Chantal Akerman

See also
"Il doit faire beau là-bas", French entry in the Eurovision Song Contest 1967, performed by Noëlle Cordier